Ahmed Obaid Bin Dagher (born 2 December 1952) is a Yemeni politician currently serving as chairman of Yemen's Shura Council since 17 January 2021. He was Prime Minister of Yemen from 4 April 2016 to 15 October 2018 as part of the  internationally recognized Aden. On 22 September 2016, Dagher returned to Yemen by flying from Riyadh along with seven ministers to Aden.

References

1952 births
General People's Congress (Yemen) politicians
Communication ministers of Yemen
Living people
People from Hadhramaut Governorate
Prime Ministers of Yemen
Yemeni Muslims
21st-century Yemeni politicians
21st-century prime ministers of Yemen
Chairmen of the Consultative Assembly of Yemen